Mendota station is an Amtrak intercity train station at 783 Main Street, Mendota, Illinois, United States.

The station was originally built on February 23, 1888, by the Chicago, Burlington and Quincy Railroad, as a replacement for the former Union Depot that was built in 1853 and burned down in 1885. It originally contained a hotel, restaurants and waiting rooms for passengers, and rooms for railroad employees. In 1942, much of the station was torn down, with little more than the waiting room and ticket office remaining intact.

Today the building is owned and preserved by the Mendota Museum and Historical Society as the Union Depot Railroad Museum. The station is a regular stop for the state-supported Illinois Zephyr and Carl Sandburg trains, and the long-distance Southwest Chief. The California Zephyr also uses these tracks, but does not stop in Mendota. BNSF Railway also has a small freight yard and office adjacent to the station. This yard is used to store trains and locomotives that do local runs along the Mendota Subdivision (which are usually pulled by four axle road switchers).

Bibliography

References

External links

Mendota Amtrak Station (USA Rail Guide -- Train Web)
Union Depot Railroad Museum

Amtrak stations in Illinois
Mendota, Illinois
Former Chicago, Burlington and Quincy Railroad stations
Railway stations in the United States opened in 1853
Railway hotels in the United States
Railway stations in LaSalle County, Illinois
Museums in LaSalle County, Illinois
Railroad museums in Illinois
Model railway shows and exhibitions
1853 establishments in Illinois